Encarnación Cabré Herreros (21 March 1911 – 18 March 2005) was a Spanish archaeologist.

Cabré developed her interests in archaeology at a young age and accompanied her father , a prominent Spanish archaeologist, on expeditions to peninsular Spain. She became a prolific academic in archaeological excavation in the 1930s, documenting her activities in various journal publications and presenting them at international conferences. After the Spanish Civil War, the Francoist dictatorship forbade her from teaching, and she mostly retired. She returned to the field in 1975, where she worked for the rest of her life.

Cabré is considered to be the first woman in Spain to become a professional archaeologist. In 2019, the Spanish parliament recognised her for contributions to women's professional advancement.

Biography

Early life 

Encarnación Cabré Herreros was born on 21 March 1911 in Madrid, Spain, to a middle-class family with "deep Catholic roots." Her father, was a prominent Spanish archaeologist. She lived the first six years of her life in her maternal grandparents' home in Santa María de Huerta, as her father could not own a house due to the intense nature of his work.

In Madrid, she was enrolled into the Colegio de Monjas del Sagrado Corazón for her primary education. Later in 1921, she had her first experience with archaeological excavations when she visited Cantabria, where her father was inspecting archaeological sites.

Academic career 

Cabré began to work as her father's main collaborator with much of his fieldwork in 1927, when she was seventeen years old. She accompanied him on excavations in peninsular Spain through her university education and until the Spanish Civil War, and later acted as a co-author on the report of their results. She attended the Complutense University of Madrid from 1928 to 1932, where she obtained a degree in history. In September 1929, she attended the IV International Congress of Classical Archaeology in Barcelona, where she presented the only study conducted by a Spanish woman. She also attended the XV International Congress of Prehistoric Archaeology and Anthropology in Portugal in 1930. The same year, her portrait was included in publications by the Portuguese and French press which discussed the modernity of Spanish women.

Around this time in 1933, she participated in a  organised by the University of Madrid for university students and faculty. However, the Francoist dictatorship forbade her from continuing her tenure at the University of Madrid. She used the scholarship to attend prehistory and ethnography courses at universities in Berlin and Hamburg in 1934 and 1935. From 1934 to 1936, she spent time in France, Germany, Austria, Czechoslovakia, Italy, and Switzerland as a part of a pedagogical initiative launched by Spanish government.

From 1937 to 1939, Cabré completed her doctoral studies while she worked under the archaeologist Manuel Gómez-Moreno Martínez at the Center for Historical Studies. Her thesis focused on Iron Age weaponry in the Iberian Peninsula. She was forced to retire from the field of archaeology in 1939 due to family obligations, after marrying Francisco Morán. She then only intermittently published works, primarily in collaboration with her father. After her father died in 1947, she returned to the field, mainly to publish his work in various academic journals and conference proceedings from 1949 to 1959.

Later life 

Cabré began to publish again in 1975, mainly in collaboration with her son Juan Morán Cabré, and continued doing so until the end of her life. She died on 18 March 2005 in Madrid. Upon her death, she had her father's and her own archives donated to the Autonomous University of Madrid.

Legacy 
According to archaeologist , in the first three decades of the 20th century, women were incompletely incorporated into professional archaeology and scarcely took part in excavations, often viewed as "a disruptive and undesirable element" on excavations. Margarita Díaz-Andreu, an archaeologist at the University of Barcelona, has defined Cabré as an exception to this predominant view, since Cabré was exposed to the field of archaeology through her father and collaborated with him on much of his fieldwork.

The garden would be renamed as the Jardín de Encarnación Cabré in recognition of her role in the "group of young women who opened the university to many others and demonstrated that women can successfully enter traditionally masculine disciplines." On 27 February 2019, the Committee of Culture in the Congress of Deputies unanimously approved the proposal.

Notes

References 

 
 
 
 
 
 
 
 

1911 births
2005 deaths
People from Madrid
20th-century Spanish archaeologists
20th-century Spanish women scientists
Spanish women archaeologists
Complutense University of Madrid alumni